Quinamávida (Mapudungun: "hill of cereals") is a Chilean village in the commune of Colbún, Linares Province, Maule Region. Quinamávida is well known in Chile as a popular hot springs and resort spa.

External links
 Quinamávida (Google maps)
Chile Hot Springs Guide

Populated places in Linares Province